Hugh Moffat may refer to:
Hugh Moffat (footballer) (1885–1952), English footballer
Hugh Moffat (politician) (1810–1884), mayor of Detroit
Hugh Moffatt (singer) (born 1948), American country singer and songwriter
Hugh Moffatt (footballer) (1894–1961), Australian footballer